Cerethrius was a Gallic king in Thrace. He was defeated in 277 BC, by Antigonus II Gonatas at the Battle of Lysimachia.

References

Celtic warriors
Gaulish rulers
Ancient Thrace
3rd-century BC rulers